Lakshan Madushanka (born 10 December 1990) is a Sri Lankan cricketer. He made his first-class debut for Sri Lanka Army Sports Club in the 2013–14 Premier Trophy on 7 February 2014.

References

External links
 

1990 births
Living people
Sri Lankan cricketers
Sri Lanka Army Sports Club cricketers
Place of birth missing (living people)